A Civil War Memorial stands in downtown Webster, Massachusetts in front of the town hall as one part of a series of war monuments called Honor Court.  This memorial was dedicated in 1907 and consists of a central tower with a bronze statue of a soldier on top. Four other bronze statues of soldiers stand at each of the four corners: an infantryman, artilleryman, cavalryman, and sailor.

Each bronze soldier statue was created in 125% scale from real life. 

On October 11, 1906 the contract for this memorial was awarded to J.W. White & Sons of Quincy.

Gallery

References

External links 
 Webster Civil War Monument on "Massachusetts Civil War Monuments Project"

1907 establishments in Massachusetts
1907 sculptures
Bronze sculptures in Massachusetts
Sculptures of men in Massachusetts
Statues in Massachusetts
Union (American Civil War) monuments and memorials in Massachusetts